Wang Yifu (born December 4, 1960 in Liaoyang, Liaoning) is a male Chinese pistol shooter, and in terms of Olympic medals one of the most successful sport shooters of all times, and was the first shooter with six individual Olympic medals. He specializes in the 50 m Pistol and 10 m Air Pistol events. He is the only shooter to have won two gold medals in men's 10 metre air pistol.

Wang won his first Olympic medal in the Los Angeles games at the age of 23. After this, the Air Pistol event was added to the program, and this is where he has achieved his greatest accomplishments. He won the 1992 gold medal only days after a new medal in the 50 m event. His three attempts to repeat the victory have provided impressive results and very tight duels:
 In 1996, Wang had a two-point pre-final lead over Roberto Di Donna (Italy), and seemed to be the clear winner until in the last shot he got only 6.5 (at a level where anything below 9.0 is considered a very bad shot), and lost the gold medal by the closest possible margin, 0.1 point. Related to this was a collapse due to medical issues coupled with the extreme heat in Atlanta that day.
 In 2000, both Wang and Franck Dumoulin (France) scored 590 points and tied for a new Olympic record. Wang lost by two points in the final.
 In the 2004 competition, Wang scored 590 once more, but lost the Olympic record to Mikhail Nestruev (Russia) who achieved 591. However, the Chinese managed to erase the small gap and eventually won by a margin of 0.2 points to get his second Olympic gold.

Also in the ISSF World Shooting Championships, Wang has won both 50 m Pistol (in 1994) and 10 m Air Pistol (in 1998).

Wang Yifu is married to sport shooter Zhang Qiuping.

See also
List of multiple Summer Olympic medalists

References

External links
 Wang's profile at ISSF NEWS

1960 births
Living people
ISSF pistol shooters
Olympic bronze medalists for China
Olympic gold medalists for China
Olympic shooters of China
Olympic silver medalists for China
Sportspeople from Liaoyang
Shooters at the 1984 Summer Olympics
Shooters at the 1988 Summer Olympics
Shooters at the 1992 Summer Olympics
Shooters at the 1996 Summer Olympics
Shooters at the 2000 Summer Olympics
Shooters at the 2004 Summer Olympics
Olympic medalists in shooting
Sport shooters from Liaoning
Medalists at the 2004 Summer Olympics
Asian Games medalists in shooting
Shooters at the 1982 Asian Games
Shooters at the 1986 Asian Games
Shooters at the 1990 Asian Games
Shooters at the 1994 Asian Games
Shooters at the 1998 Asian Games
Shooters at the 2002 Asian Games
Chinese male sport shooters
Medalists at the 2000 Summer Olympics
Medalists at the 1996 Summer Olympics
Medalists at the 1992 Summer Olympics
Medalists at the 1984 Summer Olympics
Asian Games gold medalists for China
Asian Games silver medalists for China
Asian Games bronze medalists for China
Medalists at the 1982 Asian Games
Medalists at the 1986 Asian Games
Medalists at the 1990 Asian Games
Medalists at the 1994 Asian Games
Medalists at the 1998 Asian Games
Medalists at the 2002 Asian Games